Ulan İstanbul is a Turkish drama TV series that aired from 23 June 2014 to 23 March 2015 on the Kanal D network. The television finale aired on 9 February 2015, and its last six episodes were streamed on the internet.

Plot 
The TV series portrays a group of con-artists disguised as a well-established Istanbul family, the Nevizades. Firuz (Emre Kınay) loses one million Turkish Lira in a scam and blames Derya's father, Captain(Sevtap Özaltun), for his loss, resulting in Captain being imprisoned. This leads Kandemir (Uğur Polat), a member of the Nevizade family, and his five children to become con-artists, scamming "bad" people in order to raise money for Captain's release. The Nevizade family begins by moving to a historical street of Istanbul.

After the 29th episode of the series, the Nevizade family finally manages to collect one million Turkish Lira, enough to free Captain. However, unknown to them, one of their scams was recorded by a former family friend, Firuz. In lieu of being exposed by Firuz, the family is blackmailed into working for Firuz and continues to scam people.

Characters

Release 
The show started being broadcast on Kanal D and was released via Kanal D's web portal. After the 33rd episode, the show ended its television broadcasts and became web-only. The first web episode was aired on 16 February 2015 and was free to view, along with the second and third web episodes. The following episodes were paid-only. The show ended with the explanation that Turkish audiences were not yet ready to pay for content.

References

External links
 Ulan İstanbul at Kanal D web site

2014 Turkish television series debuts
2015 Turkish television series endings
Kanal D original programming
Turkish drama television series
Television series by D Productions
Television series produced in Istanbul
Television shows set in Istanbul
Television series set in the 2010s